In mathematics, an Arf ring was defined by  to be a 1-dimensional commutative semi-local Macaulay ring satisfying some extra conditions studied by .

References

Commutative algebra